Nosa (in Serbian Cyrillic: Носа, in Hungarian: Nosza), is a small settlement (hamlet) in Serbia. It is situated in the Subotica municipality, North Bačka District, Vojvodina province.

Geography
Officially, Nosa is not classified as a separate settlement, but as part of Hajdukovo, a suburban part of the city Subotica. It is located between the city agglomeration, and settlement Male Pijace, and situated right at the border with municipality Kanjiža, North Banat District.

What makes the status of Nosa special is that most of the settlement lies in Subotica, but one easternmost street in the municipality Kanjiža. Both Nosa and Hajdukovo are administered in cadaster Palić.

References

Sources
Vojvodina - auto karta, Magic Map, Smederevska Palanka, 2001.

See also
Subotica
List of places in Serbia
List of cities, towns and villages in Vojvodina

Places in Bačka
Subotica
North Bačka District